Gover Conner “Ox” Emerson (December 18, 1907 – November 26, 1998) was an American football player.

Early life and college career
Born and raised in rural East Texas, Emerson played high school football at Orange High School. He later played starting left guard on the Texas Longhorns team of 1929 and 1930 under coach Clyde Littlefield. He garnered all-Southwest Conference honors in 1930. He expected to play for the Longhorns in the 1931 season and was to be the team captain but he had participated in two plays with the varsity in the 1928 Baylor game and was declared ineligible for the 1931 season.

NFL career
He began his pro career with the Portsmouth Spartans in 1931 for a salary of $75 per game. In 1934, the Spartans became the Detroit Lions. With Emerson blocking and leading the way the 1936 Lions team set a rushing record of 2,885 yards in a twelve-game season, a record that lasted 36 years. It was finally broken by the Miami Dolphins in 1972 in a fourteen-game season. Emerson retired in 1937 to become line coach under Potsy Clark for the Brooklyn Dodgers, but then briefly returned as player.

After football
Finally retiring in 1939, Emerson returned to Detroit, working in the personnel department of the Ford Motor Company and coaching at Wayne State University. During World War II he served his country in the U.S. Navy in 1942 and attained the rank of lieutenant commander. He served on the aircraft carrier USS Block Island, which was sunk in the Atlantic by German submarine U-549. Transferred back to the United States, Emerson coached the Naval Air Station Corpus Christi team until his discharge.

He stayed in Corpus Christi coaching Alice High School and Del Mar Junior College until he was offered the freshman coaching position at the University of Texas at Austin in 1951. Emerson remained at Texas until the end of the 1956 football season and returned to high school coaching in the Austin, Texas area. In 1976, he coached football and taught American history at St. Louis Catholic School until his final retirement in 1985.

The Professional Football Researchers Association named Emerson to the PRFA Hall of Very Good Class of 2010 

Emerson is one of ten players that were named to the National Football League 1930s All-Decade Team that have not been inducted into the Pro Football Hall of Fame.

References

External links

1907 births
1998 deaths
American football centers
American football guards
American football tackles
Brooklyn Dodgers (NFL) coaches
Brooklyn Dodgers (NFL) players
Detroit Lions players
Portsmouth Spartans players
Texas Longhorns football players
Wayne State Warriors football coaches
Coaches of American football from Texas
Players of American football from Texas
High school football coaches in Texas
Junior college football coaches in the United States
United States Navy officers
United States Navy personnel of World War II
Military personnel from Texas
People from Nacogdoches County, Texas